HR 6806 or HD 166620 is a solitary, orange, main sequence, and Sun-like (K2 V) star located thirty-six light-years away, in the constellation Hercules. The star is smaller than the Sun, with around 79% of the solar mass and radius, and 35% of the solar luminosity. It appears to be rotating slowly with an estimated period of 42 days. In 1988, it was noticed that the star had an inactive chromosphere, with a surface magnetic field strength of only 1,500 G. From 1990 activity in the chromosphere increased, inline with a 16 year stellar cycle previously observed. But, sometime after 1994 (exact date unknown because of a data collection gap between 1995 and 2004) chromospheric activity greatly reduced, and has stayed flat for more than 16 years.  the star appears to have entered the equivalent of a Maunder minimum. The star is around six billion years of age.

There was suspected to be a nearby very cool, and very dim, T9 to Y brown dwarf companion, WISE J180901.07+383805.4, at an angular separation of 769″, which would have corresponded to a projected separation of 8460 AU at the distance of HR 6806. However, with further observation it was found to be bluer than at first thought and more typical of a slightly brighter T7 dwarf, which would place it at a much greater distance of —ruling out a physical association. This is confirmed by the differing proper motion of the star and this object.

References

External links 
 
 NStars: 1809+3827

K-type main-sequence stars
HR, 6806
Maunder Minimum
Hercules (constellation)
Durchmusterung objects
0706
166620
088972
6806